The constitutional reforms of Julius Caesar were a series of laws to the Constitution of the Roman Republic enacted between 49 and 44 BC, during Caesar's dictatorship. Caesar was murdered in 44 BC before the implications of his constitutional actions could be realized.

Julius Caesar's constitutional framework

During his early career, Caesar had seen how chaotic and dysfunctional the Roman Republic had become. The republican machinery had broken down under the weight of imperialism, the central government had become powerless, the provinces had been transformed into independent principalities under the absolute control of their governors, and the army had replaced the constitution as the means of accomplishing political goals. With a weak central government, political corruption had spiraled out of control, and the status quo had been maintained by a corrupt aristocracy, which saw no need to change a system which had made all of its members quite rich.

Between his crossing of the Rubicon River in 49 BC, and his assassination in 44 BC, Caesar established a new constitution, which was intended to accomplish three separate goals. First, he wanted to suppress all armed resistance out in the provinces, and thus bring order back to the Republic. Second, he wanted to create a strong central government in Rome. And finally, he wanted to knit together the entire Republic into a single cohesive unit. The first goal was accomplished when Caesar defeated Pompey and his supporters. To accomplish the other two goals, he needed to ensure that his control over the government was undisputed, and so he assumed these powers by increasing his own authority, and by decreasing the authority of Rome's other political institutions. To increase his own powers, he assumed the important magistrates, and to weaken Rome's other political institutions, he instituted several additional reforms. He controlled the process by which candidates were nominated for magisterial elections, he appointed his own supporters to the senate, and he prevented hostile measures from being adopted by the assemblies.

Julius Caesar's reforms

Caesar held both the Dictatorship and the Tribunate, but alternated between the Consulship and the Proconsulship. His powers within the state seem to have rested upon these magistracies. He was first appointed Dictator in 49 BC by the Praetor (and future Triumvir) Marcus Aemilius Lepidus, possibly in order to preside over elections, but resigned his Dictatorship within eleven days. In 48 BC, he was appointed Dictator again, only this time for an indefinite period, and in 46 BC, he was appointed Dictator for ten years. In February 44 BC, one month before his assassination, he was appointed Dictator for life. The Dictatorship of Caesar was fundamentally different from the Dictatorship of the early and middle republic, as he held the office for life, rather than for six months, and he also held certain judicial powers which the ordinary Dictators had not held. Under Caesar, a significant amount of authority had been vested in both the Master of the Horse, as well as in the Urban Prefect, which had not been the case under earlier Dictators. They held these additional powers under Caesar, however, because Caesar was frequently out of Italy. Earlier Dictators, in contrast, were almost never allowed to leave Italy.

In October 45 BC, Caesar resigned his position as sole Consul, and facilitated the election of two successors for the remainder of the year, which, in theory at least, restored the ordinary Consulship, since the constitution did not recognize a single Consul without a colleague. However, this also set a precedent which Caesar's imperial successors followed, since under the empire, Consuls served for several months, resigned, and then the emperor facilitated the election of successors for the remainder of that Consular term. Caesar's actions, therefore, further submitted the Consuls to the Dictatorial executive. In 48 BC, Caesar was given permanent tribunician powers, which made his person sacrosanct, allowed him to veto the senate, and allowed him to dominate the Plebeian Council. Since Tribunes were always elected by the Plebeian Council, Caesar had hoped to prevent the election of Tribunes who might oppose him, although on at least one occasion, Tribunes did attempt to obstruct him. The offending Tribunes in this case, C. Epidius Marullus and L. Caesetius Flavus, were brought before the senate and divested of their office, and as such, Caesar used the same theory of popular sovereignty that Tiberius Gracchus had used against Marcus Octavius in 133 BC. This was not the first time that Caesar had violated a Tribune's sacrosanctity, since after he had first marched on Rome in 49 BC, he forcibly opened the Treasury in spite of a seal placed on it by a Tribune. After the impeachment of the two obstructive Tribunes, Caesar, perhaps unsurprisingly, faced no further opposition from other members of the tribunician college.

In 46 BC, Caesar gave himself the title of "Prefect of the Morals" (praefectura morum), which was an office that was new only in name, as its powers were identical to those of the Censorship. Thus, he could hold Censorial powers, while technically not subjecting himself to the same checks that the ordinary Censors were subject to, and he used these powers to fill the senate with his own partisans. He also set the precedent, which his imperial successors followed, of requiring the senate to bestow various titles and honors upon him. He was, for example, given the title of "Father of the Fatherland" ("pater patriae") and "imperator" (an honorary title, not to be confused with the modern title of "emperor"). Coins bore his likeness, and he was given the right to speak first during senate meetings. Caesar then increased the number of magistrates who were elected each year, which created a large pool of experienced magistrates, and allowed Caesar to reward his supporters. This also weakened the powers of the individual magistrates, and thus of the magisterial colleges. Caesar even took steps to transform Italy into a province, and to more tightly link the other provinces of the empire into a single cohesive unit. This addressed the underlying problem that had caused the Social War decades earlier, where individuals outside Rome, and certainly outside Italy, were not considered "Roman", and thus were not given full citizenship rights. This process, of ossifying the entire Roman Empire into a single unit, rather than maintaining it as a network of unequal principalities, would ultimately be completed by Caesar's successor, the emperor Augustus.

When Caesar returned to Rome in 47 BC, the ranks of the senate had been severely depleted, and so he used his Censorial powers to appoint many new senators, which eventually raised the senate's membership to 900. All of these appointments were of his own partisans, which robbed the senatorial aristocracy of its prestige, and made the senate increasingly subservient to him. While the assemblies continued to meet, Caesar submitted all candidates to the assemblies for election, and all bills to the assemblies for enactment, which caused the assemblies to become powerless and unable to oppose him. To minimize the risk that another general might attempt to challenge him, Caesar passed a law which subjected governors to term limits: Governors of Praetorial provinces had to abdicate their office after one year, while governors of Consular provinces had to abdicate their office after two years. Near the end of his life, Caesar began to prepare for a war against the Parthian Empire. Since his absence from Rome might limit his ability to install his own Consuls, he passed a law which allowed him to appoint all magistrates in 43 BC, and all Consuls and Tribunes in 42 BC. This, in effect, transformed the magistrates from being representatives of the people to being representatives of the Dictator, while this conferred a significant amount of political influence on himself, Caesar saw this as necessary in order to contest the domineering influence of the Senate and Equestrians within the Plebeian councils.

Caesar's assassination and the Second Triumvirate

Caesar was assassinated in March 44 BC. The motives of the conspirators were both personal and political. Many of Caesar's ultimate assassins were jealous of him, and unsatisfied as to the recognition that they had received from him. Most of the conspirators were senators, and many of them were angry about the fact that he had deprived the senate of much of its power and prestige. They were also angry that, while they had received few honors, Caesar had been given many honors. There were also rumors that he was going to make himself king. The grievances that they held against him were vague, and as such, their plan against him was vague. The fact that their motives were vague, and that they had no idea of what to do after his assassination, both were plainly obvious by the subsequent course of events.

After Caesar's assassination, Mark Antony, who at the time had been Caesar's fellow consul, eventually formed an alliance with Caesar's adopted son and great-nephew, Gaius Octavian. Along with Marcus Aemilius Lepidus, who was Caesar's magister equity (master of horse) at the time of his assassination, they constituted an alliance known as the Second Triumvirate. They held powers that were nearly identical to the powers that Caesar had held under his constitution, and as such, the senate and assemblies remained powerless. The conspirators were defeated at the Battle of Philippi in 42 BC. Lepidus became powerless, and Antony went to Egypt to seek glory in the east, while Octavian remained in Rome. Eventually, however, Antony and Octavian fought against each other in one last battle. Antony was defeated in the naval Battle of Actium in 31 BC, and committed suicide in 30 BC. In 29 BC, Octavian returned to Rome, as the unchallenged master of the state. In 27 BC, Octavian offered to give up the Dictatorial powers which he had held since 42 BC, but the senate refused, and thus ratified his status as master of the state. He became the first Roman Emperor, Augustus, and the transition from Roman Republic to Roman Empire was complete.

See also

 Crisis of the Roman Republic
 Constitutional reforms of Augustus
 Roman Law
 Roman consul
 Curia
 Praetor
 Quaestor
 Aedile
 Roman Dictator
 Master of the Horse
 Roman Senate
 Cursus honorum
 Interrex
 Promagistrate
 Acta Senatus

References

 Abbott, Frank Frost (1901). A History and Description of Roman Political Institutions. Elibron Classics.
 Byrd, Robert (1995). The Senate of the Roman Republic. U.S. Government Printing Office, Senate Document 103-23.
 Cicero, Marcus Tullius (1841). The Political Works of Marcus Tullius Cicero: Comprising his Treatise on the Commonwealth; and his Treatise on the Laws. Translated from the original, with Dissertations and Notes in Two Volumes. By Francis Barham, Esq. London: Edmund Spettigue. Vol. 1.
 Lintott, Andrew (1999). The Constitution of the Roman Republic. Oxford University Press.
 Polybius (1823). The General History of Polybius: Translated from the Greek. By James Hampton. Oxford: Printed by W. Baxter. Fifth Edition, Vol 2.
 Taylor, Lily Ross (1966). Roman Voting Assemblies: From the Hannibalic War to the Dictatorship of Caesar. The University of Michigan Press.

Notes

Further reading

 Cambridge Ancient History, Volumes 9–13.
 Cameron, A. The Later Roman Empire, (Fontana Press, 1993).
 Crawford, M. The Roman Republic, (Fontana Press, 1978).
 Gruen, E. S. "The Last Generation of the Roman Republic" (U California Press, 1974)
 Ihne, Wilhelm. Researches Into the History of the Roman Constitution. William Pickering. 1853.
 Johnston, Harold Whetstone. Orations and Letters of Cicero: With Historical Introduction, An Outline of the Roman Constitution, Notes, Vocabulary and Index. Scott, Foresman and Company. 1891.
 Lintott, A. "The Constitution of the Roman Republic" (Oxford University Press, 1999)
 Millar, F. The Emperor in the Roman World, (Duckworth, 1977, 1992).
 Mommsen, Theodor. Roman Constitutional Law. 1871-1888
Parenti, Michael. "The Assassination of Julius Caesar: A People's History of Ancient Rome". The New Press, 2003. .
 Tighe, Ambrose. The Development of the Roman Constitution. D. Apple & Co. 1886.
 Von Fritz, Kurt. The Theory of the Mixed Constitution in Antiquity. Columbia University Press, New York. 1975.
 Polybius. The Histories.

Primary sources
 Cicero's De Re Publica, Book Two
 Rome at the End of the Punic Wars: An Analysis of the Roman Government; by Polybius

Secondary source material
 Considerations on the Causes of the Greatness of the Romans and their Decline, by Montesquieu
 The Roman Constitution to the Time of Cicero
 What a Terrorist Incident in Ancient Rome Can Teach Us

External links
Videos of talks by Michael Parenti, about his book "The Assassination of Julius Caesar: A People's History of Ancient Rome", which explains how wealthy and conservative elites killed Caesar to end his egalitarian reforms: 76 minute talk in 1 part, and in 8 parts.

Julius Caesar
Roman Republic
Roman law
 
40s BC
1st century BC in the Roman Republic
Reform in the Roman Republic